Aldri annet enn bråk is a 1954 Norwegian comedy-drama film, edited by Edith Carlmar. It takes place in  a working-class setting in the city of Oslo. The English title is Nothing but trouble. A 1955 Danish remake, Altid ballade, was directed by Gabriel Axel.

References

External links
 

1954 films
1954 comedy-drama films
1950s Norwegian-language films
Films directed by Edith Carlmar
Norwegian black-and-white films
Films about dysfunctional families
Norwegian comedy-drama films